Giovanella may refer to:

Zoology
 Giovanella, a genus of flies from South America

Person
 Everton Giovanella, Brazilian footballer
 Mattia Giovanella (born 1997), Italian curler